Keratea is a town in East Attica, Greece. Since the 2011 local government reform it is part of the municipality Lavreotiki, of which it is a municipal unit. The municipal unit has an area of 129.864 km2. It is part of Athens metropolitan area.

Geography

Keratea is situated in the hills in the southeastern part of the Attica peninsula, 6 km west of the Aegean Sea coast, at about 200 m elevation. It is 5 km southeast of Kalyvia Thorikou, 12 km northwest of Lavrio and 29 km southeast of Athens city centre. Greek National Road 89 (Gerakas - Koropi - Lavrio - Sounio) passes through Keratea.

In antiquity, the area of present Keratea was part of the deme Cephale, of the phyle Acamantis in Mesogeia area of Ancient Athens.

Historical population

The town has historically been an Arvanite settlement.

Historical monuments 
The church of St. Athanasius (Kronizes). A wall painting monument (1744) of George Markou the Argus, the great and prolific post-Byzantine ecclesiastic iconographer of the 18th century (".... Il Santo Athanasio, che si trova alla Regione Cronizes di Kerateas dell 'Attica...." Evangelos Andreou http://ketlib.lib.unipi.gr/xmlui/handle/ket/849 )

Sports
Keratea hosts the sport teams Keravnos Keratea F.C., one of the most successful East Attica football clubs, and the multi-sport G.S. Kerateas (Gymnastikos Syllogos Kerateas), the women's volleyball team has represent the town in Greek A1 Division for several years.

See also
List of municipalities of Attica

References

External links
Official website (in Greek, link to English version available)
http://members.tripod.com/~Mesogia_Keratea/
https://web.archive.org/web/20060515075537/http://www.athleticsclubkeratea.org/
Antenna on Keratea's hydrogen factory (in Greek)
"Violence spikes in Greek rebel town" by Elena Becatoros, The Independent,  16 April 2011
http://www.forkeratea.com Η ηλεκτρονικη αρχειοθηκη δημοσιευσεων που αφορουν την πολη της Κερατεας και το δημο Λαυρεωτικής.

Populated places in East Attica
Arvanite settlements